The Nottely River is a river in the United States. The river originates in the Blue Ridge Mountains in northern Georgia. The river flows for  into the artificial Hiwassee Reservoir in North Carolina.  The Nottely River is dammed in Georgia, creating Lake Nottely. Arkaqua Creek is a tributary.

Variant names
According to the Geographic Names Information System, it has also been known historically as:  
Notley River

Early history
The region was occupied by Native Americans, associated with modern-day Muskogean tribes, until the early 18th century. The earliest European maps only vaguely show the area to be occupied by a mountain branch of the Apalachee people. However, it is quite likely that groups ancestral to the Creek and/or Yuchi Indians occupied the Nottely River Basin at some time in the past.  After the Cherokees occupied the region, most of their villages had names from the Muskogee (Creek) language. However, the region seems to have remained thinly populated due to its proximity to Creek Indian territory.

The origin of the word, Nottely, is not known for certain, but appears to be derived from the Hitchiti-Creek word Note-le, which means, "People on the Other Side."

In 1715 the Cherokees invited leaders of all the major Creek provinces to a diplomatic conference in the nearby town of Tugaloo, at the head of the Savannah River. All of the Creek leaders were murdered in their sleep. This act of treachery precipitated a 40-year-long war between the Creeks and the Cherokees. Initially, all the branches of the Creeks were involved, but only the Kowita branch fought the war continuously. By the 1750s, the Kowita Creeks alone had gained so much military prowess that they were consistently defeating the Cherokees in battle. One Creek war leader bragged that he had sent women and boys into battle, but still captured another Cherokee town. By 1755 the Kowita Creeks had destroyed all of the Cherokee towns and villages in the Nottely and Hiwassee Valleys.  The 1755 John Mitchell Map labels the entire region "Deserted Cherokee settlement."

In 1763 the Cherokees lost all of their territory in North Carolina, east of the 80th longitude line, which runs through Murphy, NC. This was punishment for the Cherokees switching sides in the French and Indian War. The Creeks agreed to give back their recently regained lands in North Carolina and Georgia, in return for most of the land in Alabama, which had been taken from the French by the British.  Some small Cherokee settlements such as Choestoe (Rabbit) and Chota (Frog in Creek) returned to the Nottely River Basin. In 1838, the Cherokees were removed from Georgia and were forcibly deported to the Indian Territory (Oklahoma.)

A historical marker near the Nottely River describes a massive battle in 1755 on Blood Mountain between the Cherokees and the Creeks, in which the Cherokees won all of northern Georgia.

After the Cherokee Trail of Tears, the Nottely Basin slowly filled with settlers, many of whom were from Scotland or Ulster.  The region was isolated from the remainder of the State of Georgia until the 1920s, when the first paved highways were constructed. Improved highway access during the early 21st century resulted in a population boom. Many of the new residents migrated from Florida in the aftermath of a series of severe hurricanes on the Gulf Coast. The Nottely River Basin is still farmed intensively. It is known for both sorghum syrup and several varieties of vegetables.

References

External links

Tributaries of the Hiwassee River
Rivers of Georgia (U.S. state)
Rivers of North Carolina
Rivers of Union County, Georgia
Bodies of water of Cherokee County, North Carolina